BSV are initials often adopted by German sports clubs, the SV standing for Sportverein or Spielverein:

Berliner SV 1892 (Berliner Sport-Verein)
Berliner SV 92 Rugby (Berliner Sport-Verein)
BSV Kickers Emden (Barenburger Sportverein)
BSV 98 Bayreuth which merged with 1. FC Bayreuth to form FSV Bayreuth
BSV Halle-Ammendorf (Ballspielverein)
BSV 07 Schwenningen (Ballspielverein)

Other sporting clubs:
BSV Limburgia (Dutch)
BK Søllerød-Vedbæk (Danish)

BSV may also refer to:
Banana streak virus
Bilim ve Sanat Vakfı, the foundation which established Istanbul Şehir University
Bitcoin Satoshi Vision (BSV), a cryptocurrency forked from Bitcoin Cash (BCH) in November 2018
The .BSV file extension in BSAVE (graphics image format)
Buckshaw Parkway railway station's station code
Black Sign Variation, another name for Black American Sign Language
Bodo saltans virus